Cipriana Correia (born August 12, 1990) is an Ecuadorian beauty pageant titleholder who was crowned Miss World Ecuador 2012 and represented her Ecuador in the 2012 Miss World pageant.

Early life
Born in Esmeraldas. Correia speaks Spanish and English, she loves playing soccer, and she is current student of journalism at ITV.

Miss Ecuador 2012 

References

External links
Official Miss Ecuador website

1990 births
Living people
Ecuadorian beauty pageant winners
Miss World 2012 delegates